Calvin Everett Lee (born August 19, 1939) was a provincial level politician from Alberta, Canada. He served as a member of the Legislative Assembly of Alberta from 1971 to 1975 sitting with the governing Progressive Conservative caucus.

Political career
Lee ran for a seat to the Alberta Legislature in the 1971 Alberta general election. He faced three other candidates in the new electoral district of Calgary-McKnight. Lee won the hotly contested race finishing ahead of Social Credit candidate Jim Richards to pick up the district for the Progressive Conservatives who formed government in that election.

Lee would retire from provincial politics at dissolution of the assembly in 1975.

References

External links
Legislative Assembly of Alberta Members Listing

Progressive Conservative Association of Alberta MLAs
Living people
1939 births